Carlisle is an unparished area in the City of Carlisle, Cumbria, England. It contains about 350 buildings that are recorded in the National Heritage List for England. Of these, 24 are listed at Grade I, the highest of the three grades, 26 are at Grade II*, the middle grade, and the others are at Grade II, the lowest grade.

Carlisle is a city with a cathedral and is the county town of Cumbria. During the Roman era, it was the most northernmost city of the Roman Empire, and contained the largest fort on Hadrian's Wall. In 1122 an Augustinian priory was established by Henry I, this later becoming the cathedral. Also during the 12th century and later, the fortifications, including the city walls and the castle, were strengthened to defend against raids from the Scots. The city began to grow from the middle of the 18th century, stimulated by the building of the turnpikes towards Newcastle upon Tyne and London in the 1750s, followed by a canal and later the railway. It grew as an ecclesiastical and commercial centre and the cotton industry developed in the city. Fine houses were built, many in Georgian style, initially mainly around the city centre, and later in the growing suburbs.

The listed buildings largely reflect the city's history. The earliest buildings are what is left from the defensive fortifications and from the priory. These are followed by civic structures, such as the Guildhall, the former Town Hall, and the market cross. Most of the later buildings are, or originated as, houses and shops, many of which have since been converted for other uses, particularly offices. As the town grew, terraces of fine houses were built in the Warwick Road area, around squares containing central gardens such as Chatsworth and Portland Squares, and along Victoria Place. Not all the houses are in the more central areas, groups of listed houses being found for example in the former villages of Botcherby to the east of the city, and Stanwix to the north of the River Eden, and now in the unparished area. The other listed buildings include a variety of structures, including churches, inns, public houses and hotels, a bridge and a viaduct, a former brewery, former cotton mills, railway stations, banks, statues, memorials, cemetery buildings, a hospital, a disused gasholder, a pillbox, and a market.


Key

Buildings

Notes and references

Notes

Citations

Sources

Lists of listed buildings in Cumbria
Listed